The Times of Central Asia is an English language newspaper published from Bishkek, Kyrgyzstan since 1999. It ceased print publication in 2013 and is now an daily online newspaper. Readership includes embassies, NGOs, businesses and hotels which operate in the region. Since May 2019 the newspaper is managed & published by Blackwood Press LTD company.

History
The Times of Central Asia was founded by Giorgio Fiacconi, an Italian supermarket owner, and now run by Central Asia Media Institute.

Oliver Bullough got hired.

References

External links
The Times of Central Asia Website

Newspapers published in Kyrgyzstan
English-language newspapers published in Asia
Publications established in 1999
Mass media in Bishkek